Nunkovics Tibor (born 8 May 1984 in Esztergom, Hungary) is a Hungarian economist, politician and economist. He is a member of parliament in the National Assembly of Hungary (Országgyűlés) since June 2019. He was appointed member of parliament after Lajos Kepli resigned his seat on 25 June 2019. In 2022 during the parliamentary elections, Tibor lost his seat and was not re-elected.

References 

Living people
1984 births
People from Esztergom
Hungarian economists
Hungarian politicians
21st-century Hungarian politicians
Jobbik politicians
Members of the National Assembly of Hungary (2018–2022)